Miguel António Teixeira Ferreira Pedro (born 6 November 1983) is a Portuguese professional footballer who plays for F.C. Maia Lidador as an attacking midfielder.

Club career
Born in Porto, Miguel Pedro began his professional career in the second division, playing two seasons each with S.C. Salgueiros and C.D. Aves, both in the north. In the summer of 2006 he moved to the Primeira Liga with Académica de Coimbra, making his competition debut on 28 August in a 1–1 away draw against Vitória F.C. and finishing his debut campaign with 26 games and two goals, as the Students maintained their division status.

In the following years, Miguel Pedro continued to be regularly played at Académica, although rarely as a starter. Also brought from the bench, he scored against FC Porto on 25 October 2009, but in a 2–3 away defeat; the following month he was sold to Anorthosis Famagusta FC in Cyprus, for three-and-a-half years and a €100,000 transfer fee.

However, Anorthosis did not pay the solidarity contribution tax to Salgueiros and Aves, and both clubs requested arbitration from the FIFA Dispute Resolution Chamber, eventually being ordered to pay. For 2010–11, Miguel Pedro was loaned to fellow First Division side Ermis Aradippou FC.

In July 2011, Miguel Pedro returned to his country, signing a two-year contract with C.D. Feirense who had just promoted to the top level.

Club statistics

References

External links

1983 births
Living people
Footballers from Porto
Portuguese footballers
Association football midfielders
Primeira Liga players
Liga Portugal 2 players
Segunda Divisão players
S.C. Salgueiros players
C.D. Aves players
Associação Académica de Coimbra – O.A.F. players
C.D. Feirense players
Vitória F.C. players
S.C. Freamunde players
F.C. Maia players
Cypriot First Division players
Anorthosis Famagusta F.C. players
Ermis Aradippou FC players
Football League (Greece) players
Panachaiki F.C. players
Portugal youth international footballers
Portuguese expatriate footballers
Expatriate footballers in Cyprus
Expatriate footballers in Greece
Portuguese expatriate sportspeople in Cyprus
Portuguese expatriate sportspeople in Greece